Tim O'Connor James (born December 25, 1976) is a retired American professional basketball player and United States Army specialist and former head coach of the Vance-Granville Community College men's basketball team. In a three-year National Basketball Association career, he  played for the Miami Heat, the Charlotte Hornets and the Philadelphia 76ers. He also played professional basketball in Japan, Turkey and Israel.

Basketball career
He played high school basketball at Miami Northwestern High School and collegiate basketball at the University of Miami. In the 1999 NBA Draft, the Miami Heat picked James as the 25th pick overall, and James played with that team during his rookie season. He signed with the Charlotte Hornets the next season and the Philadelphia 76ers the next. The 76ers cut James in 2001. James then played abroad: for Tekelspor of the Turkish Basketball League in 2003, Cocodrilos de Caracas of LPBV, Hamamatsu Phoenix of the Japanese bj League, and Ironi Ashkelon of the Israeli Basketball Super League.

James was inducted into the University of Miami Sports Hall of Fame in 2009.

Military career
James later served in Iraq after enlisting in the U.S. Army.  An article by Dan Le Batard detailed his choices leading him to joining the military, including his decision not to tell his fellow soldiers about his NBA experience.
On 19 March 2011, James was honored with a pre-game ceremony in Miami, before his former team played the Denver Nuggets.

Coaching career
James was named head basketball coach for Vance-Granville Community College in North Carolina in 2011.

References

External links
basketball-reference.com stats

1976 births
Living people
All-American college men's basketball players
American expatriate basketball people in Israel
American expatriate basketball people in Japan
American expatriate basketball people in Turkey
American expatriate basketball people in Venezuela
United States Army personnel of the Iraq War
American men's basketball players
Basketball players from Miami
Charlotte Hornets players
Cocodrilos de Caracas players
Ironi Ashkelon players
Junior college men's basketball coaches in the United States
Miami Heat draft picks
Miami Heat players
Miami Hurricanes men's basketball players
Parade High School All-Americans (boys' basketball)
Philadelphia 76ers players
San-en NeoPhoenix players
Small forwards
Sports coaches from Miami
United States Army soldiers